Sevdah TV is specialized music television channel from Bosnia and Herzegovina dedicated to sevdah and traditional sevdalinka songs. Cable television channel is based in city of Travnik and it was established in 2015 by TNT Group. The program is produced in Bosnian language.

Sevdah TV is available via cable and IPTV systems throughout the Bosnia and Herzegovina and former Yugoslavia (with sister channels from TNT Group: Kanal 6 HD, TNT KIDS TV, DP HD; Radio: TNT Radio Travnik, TNT Radio Tuzla and Narodni Radio Zenica).

See also
 Music of Bosnia and Herzegovina
 Hayat Folk

References

External links 
 www.sevdah.tv
 www.tntgroup.ba 
 Communications Regulatory Agency of Bosnia and Herzegovina

Television in Bosnia and Herzegovina
Television channels and stations established in 2015
Music organizations based in Bosnia and Herzegovina
Music television channels